Barbara Dane (born Barbara Jean Spillman; May 12, 1927) is an American folk, blues, and jazz singer, guitarist, record producer, and political activist. She co-founded Paredon Records with Irwin Silber.

"Bessie Smith in stereo," wrote jazz critic Leonard Feather in the late 1950s. Time wrote of Dane: "The voice is pure, rich ... rare as a 20-carat diamond" and quoted Louis Armstrong's exclamation upon hearing her at the Pasadena jazz festival: "Did you get that chick? She's a gasser!" On the occasion of her 85th birthday, The Boston Globe music critic James Reed called her "one of the true unsung heroes of American music."

Early life
Dane's parents arrived in Detroit from Arkansas in the 1920s. Out of high school, Dane began to sing regularly at demonstrations for racial equality and economic justice. While still in her teens, she sat in with bands locally and won the interest of local music promoters. She received an offer to tour with Alvino Rey's band, but she turned it down in favor of singing at factory gates and in union halls.

Career as singer
To Ebony magazine, she seemed "startlingly blonde, especially when that powerful dusky alto voice begins to moan of trouble, two-timing men and freedom ... with stubborn determination, enthusiasm and a basic love for the underdog, [she is] making a name for herself ... aided and abetted by some of the oldest names in jazz who helped give birth to the blues." The seven-page article was filled with photos of Dane working with Memphis Slim, Willie Dixon, Muddy Waters, Clara Ward, Mama Yancey, Little Brother Montgomery and others.

By 1959, Louis Armstrong had asked Time magazine readers: "Did you get that chick? She's a gasser!" After his invitation, she appeared with Armstrong on the nationally screened Timex All-Star Jazz Show hosted by Jackie Gleason on January 7, 1959. She toured the East Coast with Jack Teagarden, appeared in Chicago with Art Hodes, Roosevelt Sykes, Little Brother Montgomery, Memphis Slim, Otis Spann, Willie Dixon and others, played New York with Wilbur De Paris and his band, and appeared on The Tonight Show Starring Johnny Carson as a solo guest artist. Other television work included The Steve Allen Show, Bobby Troup's Stars of Jazz, and Alfred Hitchcock Presents. 

In 1961, she opened her own club, Sugar Hill: Home of the Blues, on San Francisco's Broadway in the North Beach district, with the idea of creating a venue for the blues in a tourist district where a larger audience could hear it. At this location, Dane performed regularly with her two most constant musical companions: Kenny "Good News" Whitson on piano and cornet and Wellman Braud, the former Ellington bassist.

In her speech to the GI Movement of the Vietnam War Era (whose text can be found in the booklet included in Paredon Records' 1970 FTA! Songs of the GI Resistance LP), Barbara Dane said, "I was too stubborn to hire one of the greed-head managers, probably because I'm a woman who likes to speak for herself. I always made my own deals and contracts, and after figuring out the economics of it, I was free to choose when and where I worked, able to spend lots more time with my three children and doing political work, and even brought home more money in the end, by not going for the 'bigtime.' I did make some really nice records, because I was able to choose and work with wonderfully gifted musicians."

Political activism
She continued to weave in appearances as a solo performer on the coffeehouse circuit with her folk-style guitar. She opposed building a Pacific Gas and Electric nuclear plant at the seismically-precarious Bodega Bay. In organizing the resistance to that siting proposal, she recorded an album on the Fantasy label with Wally Rose, Bob Helm, Bob Mielke, and Lu Watters. It included the title track, "Blues Over Bodega", and another tune, "San Andreas Fault". 

She stepped up her work in the movements for peace and justice as the struggle for civil rights spread and the Vietnam war escalated. She sang at peace demonstrations in Washington, D.C. and throughout the U.S. and toured anti-war GI coffeehouses all over the world. In 1966, Dane became the first U.S. musician to tour post-revolutionary Cuba.

In January 1964, Bob Dylan praised Dane's commitment in an open letter he wrote to Broadside magazine: "the heroes of this battle are not me an Joan [Baez] an the Kingston Trio... but there's some that could use the money I mean people like Tom Paxton, Barbara Dane an Johnny Herald... they are the heroes if such a word has t be used here... we need more kind a people like that people that can't go against their conscience no matter what they might gain an I've come to think that that might be the most important thing in the whole wide world."

In 1970, Dane founded Paredon Records with husband Irwin Silber, a label specializing in international protest music. She produced nearly 50 albums, including three of her own, over a 12-year period. The label was later incorporated into Smithsonian Folkways, a label of the Smithsonian Institution, and is available through its catalog.

In 1978, Dane appeared with Pete Seeger at a rally in New York for striking coal miners.

Blues singer and role model
When Dane was in her late 70s, Philip Elwood, jazz critic of the San Francisco Examiner, said of her: "Dane is back and beautiful... she has an immense voice, remarkably well-tuned... capable of exquisite presentations regardless of the material. As a gut-level blues singer, she is without compare." Blues writer Lee Hildebrand calls her "perhaps the finest living interpreter of the classic blues of the 1920s." In a 2010 KALW profile on Dane, produced by Steven Short, blues musician Bonnie Raitt said "she's always been a role model and a hero of mine – musically and politically. I mean, the arc of her life so informs mine that – she's – I really can't think of anyone I admire [more], the way that she's lived her life."

Family
Dane was married to folk singer Rolf Cahn. Their son, Jesse Cahn, also became a folk musician. Pablo Menendez, Dane's son with jeweler Byron Menendez, leads Mezcla, a multicultural musical ensemble in Cuba. Nina Menendez, Dane's daughter, is the artistic director of the Bay Area Flamenco Festival and Festival Flamenco Gitano. In 1964, Dane married Irwin Silber, a Communist activist and former editor of Sing Out! magazine, who died in 2010. Dane resides in Oakland, California.

Discography
 Trouble in Mind (San Francisco, 1957)
 A Night at the Ash Grove (World Pacific, 1958)
 Livin' With the Blues (Dot, 1959)
 On My Way (Capitol, 1962)
 When I Was a Young Girl (Horizon, 1962)
 Sings the Blues with 6 & 12 String Guitar (Folkways, 1964)
 Lightning Hopkins with His Brothers Joel and John Henry / with Barbara Dane (Arhoolie, 1964 [1966])
 Barbara Dane and the Chambers Brothers (Folkways, 1966)
 FTA! Songs of the GI Resistance (Paredon, 1970)
 I Hate the Capitalist System (Paredon, 1973)
 When We Make It Through (Paredon, 1982)
 Sometimes I Believe She Loves Me with Lightnin' Hopkins (Arhoolie, 1996)
 What Are You Gonna Do When There Ain't No Jazz? (GHB, 2002)
 Live! at the Ash Grove: New Years Eve 1961–62 (Dreadnaught, 2004)
 Throw It Away with Tammy Hall (Dreadnaught, 2016)
Hot Jazz, Cool Blues & Hard-Hitting Songs (Smithsonian Folkways, 2018)

See also

References

External links

 Official site
 Illustrated discography
 Paredon Records, Smithsonian Folkways

1927 births
Living people
American blues singers
American women jazz singers
American jazz singers
American folk singers
American television actresses
Musicians from the San Francisco Bay Area
Singers from Detroit
Jazz musicians from Michigan
Jazz musicians from California
21st-century American women